Agonis theiformis, commonly known as summer snowflakes, is a shrub that is native to Western Australia.

It blooms between October and December producing white flowers.

It is distributed along the south coast of the South West and Great Southern where it grows sandy soils over limestone, laterite or granite.

Cultivated from seed, the plant is suitable for most soil types and is frost and drought tolerant. It is an ideal native hedging plant that responds well to pruning.

References

theiformis
Endemic flora of Southwest Australia
Plants described in 1848